Hexl may refer to:

Hexl, a dachshund owned by Wilhelm II, German Emperor
Hexl-mode, in GNU Emacs